Keyesville (formerly, Keysville and Hogeye) is an unincorporated community in Kern County, California. Keyesville, founded in 1854 is named for Richard M. Keyes, whose discovery of gold in 1853 started the Kern River Gold Rush.

History
Keyesville townsite has been privately held since the 1890's. Gold was discovered here in 1853 and the town became a gold hub of Southern California. Still located on the site are the original Post Office, Gold Assayer's office, Merchantile Building, Blacksmith Shop, and one of the brothels. A petition to the commander of Camp Babbitt about the depredations of the local Native Americans led to the Keyesville Massacre nearby on 19 April 1863. The community is registered as California Historical Landmark #98.

Natural history
Keyesville lies in the lower elevation Greenhorn Mountains. There are scattered trees and brushy chaparral slopes surrounding it. A number of wildflowers are in evidence in this part of the Greenhorn Mountains, including the yellow mariposa lily, Calochortus luteus, which species is at the southern limit of its range within the Greenhorn Mountains.

California Historical Landmark
The California Historical Landmark reads: 
NO. 98 KEYSVILLE - From 1853 until 1870, Keysville was a center of both placer and quartz gold mining. On the knoll just below the townsite may still be seen the outlines of an earthworks fort, built to meet a possible Indian attack in 1863.

See also
 California Historical Landmarks in Kern County
California Historical Landmark

References

Unincorporated communities in Kern County, California
Greenhorn Mountains
Kern River Valley
California Historical Landmarks
Populated places in the Sierra Nevada (United States)
Unincorporated communities in California